Breidenbach is a municipality in the west of Marburg-Biedenkopf district in Hesse, Germany.

Geography

Neighbouring communities
Bad Laasphe
Biedenkopf
Dautphetal
Eschenburg
Steffenberg

Community divisions
The community is divided into the Ortsteile (constituent communities) of Achenbach, Breidenbach, Kleingladenbach, Niederdieten, Oberdieten, Wiesenbach and Wolzhausen.

Politics

Municipal council
As of municipal elections on 6 March 2016 and formerly on 27 March 2011, respective on 26 March 2006, municipal council seats are apportioned thus:

Mayor 
Christoph Felkl (SPD) was elected mayor on 28. Oktober 2012 for a 6-year term beginning 01. April 2013. He was re-elected in 2018.

Werner Reitz (SPD) was formerly elected as mayor on 22 October 2000 with 59.7% of the votes.

Constituent communities' coats of arms

Sport

Sports facilities
Breidenbach has many sports facilities, including two playing fields in the main community. These are open free to the public. In Kleingladenbach there is also a skiing hill with a skilift, for which the community is becoming attractive to tourists. The main community also offers two gymnasia, a small sports hall and the Perftalhalle.

Economy and infrastructure

Shopping
The main community of Breidenbach is a well-developed, industry-rich place. A great number of shopping and leisure opportunities make Breidenbach the municipality's, and the surrounding area's, centre.

Industry
Furthermore, Breidenbach has at its disposal a large industrial area (Industriegebiet West) harbouring successful businesses such as Weber Maschinenbau and a Buderus disk brake manufacturing plant. The main community of Breidenbach thereby employs more than 2,500 workers.

Transport

Public transportation
Breidenbach is well connected to the Rhein-Main-Verkehrsverbund public transport system. The following services come to the community:
 491: Dillenburg - Niedereisenhausen - Biedenkopf (and back)
 MR-52: Biedenkopf - Friedensdorf - Niedereisenhausen - Biedenkopf (and the other way round)
 MR-55: Niedereisenhausen - Breidenbach-Wolzhausen - Friedensdorf

Education

Schools
Breidenbach has the following schools:

Kindergarten
The community Breidenbach has the following Kindergarten:
 Breidenbach (2)
 Oberdieten

Breidenbach clubs and associations
 Frauenchor 1975 Breidenbach (women's choir)
 TV 09 Breidenbach
 Trachtentanzgruppe Breidenbach (costume dance group)
 Burschenschaft Breidenbach (fraternity)
 Mädchenschaft Breidenbach (sorority)

References

External links
  
 Breidenbach history
 – Further links

Marburg-Biedenkopf